Frank Cook was an American football coach. He was the first head football coach at Buchtel College — now known as the University of Akron — leading the team for one season in 1892 and compiling a record of 3–4.

Head coaching record

References

Year of birth missing
Year of death missing
Akron Zips football coaches